The Scorpion King: Sword of Osiris is a platform game developed by WayForward Technologies and published by Universal Interactive for the Game Boy Advance in 2002. It is based on the film The Scorpion King, serving as a sequel to it.

Gameplay

Plot
The Scorpion King: Sword of Osiris is set after the events of  The Scorpion King. The wizard Menthu and the witch Isis kidnap the hero Mathayus' sorceress bride Cassandra to use her powers to awaken the Dunes of Natash and unleash a thousand-year desert storm upon Egypt. To destroy the evil pair, Mathayus needs to uncover the world's most powerful blade, the Sword of Osiris, as well as the Hero's Gauntlet. After killing Menthu, Mathayus faces Isis, who uses the Scorpion Stone which transforms her into a half-scorpion monster for the final battle.

An alternate scenario depicts Mathayus kidnapped by the villains and it is Cassandra who fights to free him. If the player fails to defeat Isis, which happens if the player failed to collect all six runes, she flees with the Scorpion Stone.

Reception

The Scorpion King: Sword of Osiris received mixed to positive review upon release. On Metacritic, the game received an average score of 72 out of 100, indicating "mixed or average reviews". 

Its review scores included 8/10 from GameSpot, 82/100 from GameSpy, 9/10 from GameZone, and 8/10 from IGN.

References

External links

The Scorpion King: Sword of Osiris at MobyGames

2002 video games
Fantasy video games
Game Boy Advance games
Game Boy Advance-only games
Side-scrolling platform games
Video game sequels
Video games based on Egyptian mythology
Video games scored by Jake Kaufman
Video games developed in the United States
Video games featuring female protagonists
Video games set in Egypt
Single-player video games
The Scorpion King (film series)
Universal Interactive games
Video games based on films
WayForward games